Gary Davies may refer to:

Gary Davies, DJ
Gary Davies (boxer) (born 1982), British bantamweight boxer

See also
Gareth Davies (disambiguation)
Gary Davis (disambiguation)